The 2014 Mid-American Conference football season was the 69th season of college football play for the Mid-American Conference (MAC) and was a part of the 2014 NCAA Division I FBS football season.

Previous season

References